Mahua Dabra Haripura is a town, a nagar panchayat in Udham Singh Nagar district in the Indian state of Uttarakhand.

Geography

Demographics
 India census, Mahua Dabra Haripura had a population of 6110. Males constitute 52% of the population and females 48%. Mahuadabra Haripura has an average literacy rate of 59%, lower than the national average of 59.5%: male literacy is 68%, and female literacy is 49%. In Mahua Dabra Haripura, 18% of the population is under 6 years of age.

References

Cities and towns in Udham Singh Nagar district